The table below is a list of United States Navy ships named after persons and places commemorating the Confederate States of America. The US Navy has named at least 26 ships after persons, who fought voluntarily with the Confederacy against the United States of America or after a victorious battle for the Confederacy. Currently two active ships exist which fell under this category –  and  – until their renaming in March 2023.

With the enactment of the National Defense Authorization Act for Fiscal Year 2021 in January 2021, the Commission on the Naming of Items of the Department of Defense that Commemorate the Confederate States of America or Any Person Who Served Voluntarily with the Confederate States of America has been tasked by Congress to develop plans to "remove all names, symbols, displays, monuments, and paraphernalia that honor or commemorate the Confederate States of America or any person who served voluntarily with the Confederate States of America from all assets of the Department of Defense," which may result in the ship's eventual renaming. In September 2022 the Naming Commission recommended to rename the cruiser USS Chancellorsville (CG-62) and oceanographic survey ship USNS Maury (T-AGS-66), with the new names to be decided by the Secretary of the Navy .

US Navy Ships commemorating the Confederate States of America

See also
United States ship naming conventions

Notes

References
NavyTimes: Meet the Navy ships named in honor of the Confederacy
Naval Vessel Register online at www.nvr.navy.mil.

Confederate States of America